Zune applications were mobile apps and games that were available for Microsoft's Zune portable media players. Some of the games were multiplayer-capable and could be played with other Zune devices within wireless reach. Zune HD games and applications were available in the "Apps" section of Zune Marketplace for free. There were forty-two games and twenty other applications officially released for the Zune HD over the span of two years.

On August 31, 2012, the "Apps" section of the Zune Marketplace and users' Zune media collections were disabled by Microsoft within the Zune Software, although it can be reenabled by editing the software's registries. All apps could still be downloaded directly to Zune HD devices using their own "Marketplace" option. As of December 2013, registry edits no longer allow the Zune app marketplace to work and apps can no longer be purchased directly via the device.

List of Zune HD applications

Game was also released for older Zune devices. (Note: Space Battle 2 is the Zune HD version of the original Space Battle for pre-HD Zune devices.)

References

Portable media players
Media players
Video game lists by platform
Zune